Harper v. Virginia State Board of Elections, 383 U.S. 663 (1966), was a case in which the U.S. Supreme Court found that Virginia's poll tax was unconstitutional under the equal protection clause of the 14th Amendment. In the late 19th and early 20th centuries, eleven southern states established poll taxes as part of their disenfranchisement of most blacks and many poor whites. The Twenty-fourth Amendment to the United States Constitution (1964) prohibited poll taxes in federal elections; five states (Alabama, Arkansas, Mississippi, Texas and Virginia) continued to require poll taxes for voters in state elections. By this ruling, the Supreme Court banned the use of poll taxes in state elections.

Background
The case was filed by Virginia resident Annie E. Harper, who was unable to register without having to pay a poll tax.  She brought the suit against the Virginia State Board of Elections on behalf of other poor residents and herself. Harper had previously argued the case before a U.S. district court on October 21, 1964, where it was consolidated with a similar case filed by Evelyn Thomas Butts, Butts v. Harrison, Governor of Virginia and argued under the name Harper v. Virginia State Board of Elections. In the initial case lawyers for Harper and Butts argued against the constitutionality of the poll tax, but on November 12 the courts dismissed the case, citing 1930s precedents established by the United States Supreme Court.

Harper quickly appealed this decision to the Supreme Court, but in a separate case from Butts. Butts later appealed in a separate suit, but the two cases were argued together during late January 1966.

Decision
In a 6 to 3 vote, the Court ruled in favor of Ms. Harper.  The Court noted that "a state violates the Equal Protection Clause of the Fourteenth Amendment to the U.S. Constitution whenever it makes the affluence of the voter or payment of any fee an electoral standard. Voter qualifications have no relation to wealth."

This ruling reversed a prior decision by the Court, Breedlove v. Suttles, which upheld the state's ability to impose poll taxes as within its powers. There had been no relevant change in the text of the Constitution between 1937 and 1966. The 24th Amendment, adopted in 1964, outlawed the poll tax in federal elections, but did not speak to the question of state elections, which was the question involved in the Harper case. The Court membership had changed, and the justices examined the issue from a different point of view.

Dissents
Joined by Justice Potter Stewart, Justice John Marshall Harlan II dissented, arguing that the Court had allowed some forms of discriminatory voting qualifications without violating the equal protection clause, e.g., Lassiter v. Northampton County Board of Elections (literacy test), Breedlove v. Suttles (poll tax on men), as long as it was rational. In this case, Virginia's poll tax could be deemed rational because of the state's desire to collect revenue and the belief that people who pay to vote might have more interest in the state's policies.

Justice Hugo Black filed a separate dissent. Black based his dissent mainly on stare decisis basis. As a textualist, he also criticized the majority for expanding the meaning of the Fourteenth Amendment by using what he called the old "natural law due process formula". He emphasized that new meanings can be added to the Constitution only through amendments.
Justice Black tended to have a complicated approach to the fourteenth amendment, as he had vehemently defended and joined the court's decision in Brown v. Board of Education (1954), which ordered the desegregation of public schools in the nation.

See also
 List of United States Supreme Court cases, volume 383
 Joseph A. Jordan Jr.

References

External links 
 
The Voting Rights Act of 1965, USDOJ.gov
John C. Bonifaz, "Not the Rich, More Than the Poor: Poverty, Race, and Campaign Finance Reform"
 

United States Supreme Court decisions that overrule a prior Supreme Court decision
History of voting rights in the United States
United States equal protection case law
United States Twenty-fourth Amendment case law
United States Supreme Court cases
1966 in United States case law
Legal history of Virginia
Civil rights movement case law
African-American history of Virginia
Virginia elections
United States Supreme Court cases of the Warren Court
1966 in Virginia
United States racial discrimination case law